Pulidindi is a village in Dr. B.R. Ambedkar Konaseema district of the Indian state of Andhra Pradesh. It is located in Atreyapuram Mandal of Amalapuram revenue division.

Pulidindi Canal was the location for much of outdoor shooting for Bapu's 1975 Telugu movie, Muthyala Muggu.

References 

Villages in Atreyapuram mandal